Shahzad Ukani (born 30 December 1985) is a Ugandan cricketer. He played for Uganda in the 2017 ICC World Cricket League Division Three tournament in May 2017. In November 2019, he was named in Uganda's squad for the Cricket World Cup Challenge League B tournament in Oman. He made his List A debut, for Uganda against Jersey, on 2 December 2019.

References

External links
 

1985 births
Living people
Ugandan cricketers
Place of birth missing (living people)